News Review was a British news magazine, first published by Cosmopolitan Press in 1936. Its publishers, who also launched Cavalcade around the same time, envisaged News Review as a competitor to the U.S. Time magazine. It was later sold to Odhams Press. The headquarters was in London. The magazine ended its run by eventually being amalgamated into Odhams' Illustrated magazine in 1950.

Writers for the News Review included Reg Freeson and a young Peter Dacre.

References

1936 establishments in the United Kingdom
1950 disestablishments in the United Kingdom
News magazines published in the United Kingdom
Magazines established in 1936
Magazines disestablished in 1950
Defunct magazines published in the United Kingdom
Magazines published in London
Odhams Press magazines